French standard sizes for oil paintings refers to a series of different sized canvases for use by artists. The sizes were fixed in the 19th century. Most artists—not only French—used this standard, as it was supported by the main suppliers of artist materials. Only some contemporary artist material suppliers continue to use these standards today, as most artists no longer differentiate canvas sizes by subject.

The main separation from size 0 (toile de 0) to size 120 (toile de 120) is divided in separate runs for faces/portraits (figure), landscapes (paysage), and marines (marine) which more or less keep the diagonal. That is, a figure 0 corresponds in height to a paysage 1 and a marine 2.
In modern times in the USA size is usually stated height by width, where as in this article it is width by height.

References 

Painting
French art

fr:Châssis_(peinture)#Formats_standard_français